The 2005–06 FIBA EuroCup Challenge was the fourth edition of Europe's fourth-tier level transnational competition for men's professional basketball clubs. 24 teams participated in the season's competition. The Russian team Ural Great Perm won the title, after beating the Ukrainian team Khimik in the double-legged final.

Teams of the 2005-06 FIBA EuroCup Challenge

Regular season

Top 16
The top 16 were two-legged ties determined on aggregate score. The first legs was played on December 8. All return legs were played on December 15.

|}

Quarterfinals
The quarterfinals were two-legged ties determined on aggregate score. The first legs was played on January 19. All return legs were played on January 26.

|}

Semifinals
The semifinals were two-legged ties determined on aggregate score. The first legs was played on February 23. All return legs were played on March 2.

|}

Finals

|}

References

FIBA EuroCup Challenge
FIBA